Laurel was an unincorporated community in Barbour County, West Virginia, United States.

References 

Unincorporated communities in West Virginia
Unincorporated communities in Barbour County, West Virginia